A Rose Is Still a Rose is the thirty-fourth studio album by American recording artist Aretha Franklin. It was released on March 24, 1998, by Arista Records. Conceived after a longer hiatus and a complete departure from her previous studio album What You See Is What You Sweat (1991), the album includes influences of 1990s hip hop as well as modern-day contemporary R&B and soul music. Throughout the project, Franklin worked with many famed hip hop producers and rappers, such as Lauryn Hill, Sean "Puffy" Combs, Jermaine Dupri, and Daryl Simmons. With the latter acts producing most of the album, A Rose Is Still a Rose deviated from the adult contemporary sound of Franklin's older work.

Most critics praised the album, calling it a return to form for Franklin and ranking it alongside her best late career albums. A Rose Is Still a Rose was nominated for a Grammy Award for Best R&B Album, while its title track earned Franklin her fifth nomination in the Best Female R&B Vocal Performance category. Commercially, the album peaked at number 30 on the US Billboard 200, her highest peak since Who's Zoomin' Who? (1985), and reached the top forty in Norway, Sweden, and Switzerland. Franklin's biggest commercial success of the 1990s, A Rose Is Still a Rose was certified gold by the RIAA and would remain her final album to earn a certification in the United States.

Background
In 1991, Franklin released her thirty-sixth studio album What You See Is What You Sweat. A moderate commercial success throughout Europe, particularly in Scandinavia, it became a commercial failure in the United States, peaking at number 153 on the US Billboard 200 and dropping off the charts after seven weeks only. While Franklin remained active the following years, providing songs on film soundtracks such as Malcolm X (1992), Sister Act 2: Back in the Habit (1993) and Waiting to Exhale (1995) and releasing her first compilation album of her Arista Records tenure in 1994, Greatest Hits: 1980–1994, which included two new singles produced by Babyface, no new full-length album was recorded.

Following a string of  ill-fated adult contemporary albums, featuring chief production from Narada Michael Walden, Luther Vandross, and others who had helped in revitalizing her career in the 1980s, Franklin envisioned a complete departure from her previous projects for her eleventh album with Arista. It was label head Clive Davis who suggested Franklin to align herself with a contingent of contemporary musicians from the R&B and hip hop scene, who would add to Franklin's soulful foundation without radically detracting it and try to re-connect her with a new audience that was embracing neo soul and hip hop soul artists such as Mariah Carey, Mary J. Blige, Erykah Badu and The Fugees. Davis would become instrumental in consulting producers and songwriters to work with Franklin, including both established and upcoming musicians such as Lauryn Hill, Sean "Puffy" Combs, Dallas Austin, Jermaine Dupri, and Daryl Simmons.

Critical reception

A Rose Is Still a Rose received generally favorable reviews from music critics who complimented Franklin on her decision to adapt a younger sound following the adult contemporary material on her previous albums. Time magazine called the album "one of the five best albums of the year", declaring it "Franklin's most rewarding album in more than two decades." The Village Voice journalist Robert Christgau gave A Rose Is Still a Rose an A rating and noted that "none of these 11 songs aspires to the declarative tunes and pungent phrases of the soul era, and at 55 Aretha is losing her high end. But after a decade in artistic seclusion, she had something to prove, and she did – with an album as audacious and accomplished as such great Wexlers as Spirit in the Dark or Young, Gifted and Black." Giving the album four stars out of four, USA Today critic Steve Jones wrote, “with the first note of A Rose Is Still a Rose, Franklin serves notice that her 30-year reign as Queen of Soul isn't about to end. After all this time, this rose remains in full bloom."

AllMusic editor Stephen Thomas Erlewine found that "the most notable element of the album is that Franklin collaborates with fresh talent, all of whom are either prominent rap figures or at least fluent in hip-hop [...] which is the last thing most observers would have expected from Franklin in 1997." While he was critical of Sean "Puffy" Combs's material, he felt that her other collaborations worked "because they find Franklin sounding vital, which is something that has not happened throughout the '90s." In his review for Rolling Stone, James Hunter wrote that "with the limited exception of Walden's songs, A Rose Is Still a Rose leaves behind Franklin's overly dogmatic eighties work. It's subtle and sexy, a miraculous immersion in hip-hop gravity, flow and humor by one of pop music's greatest living singers. It never forgets that, yes, Aretha can rock the house, but what she really excels at is mood. This is what becomes a legend most." Jeremy Helligar, writing for Entertainment Weekly, found that the album had "an unusual bloom. On tunes like ”Every Lil’ Bit Hurts” and ”Never Leave You Again,” co-producers Combs, Jermaine Dupri, Lauryn Hill, and others help Franklin recapture a gutsy urgency long missing from her records, earning her respect once more." He gave the album a B+ rating.

Commercial performance
Issued in March 1998, A Rose Is Still a Rose debuted at number 30 on the US Billboard 200 and number 7 on Billboards Top R&B/Hip-Hop Albums chart. This marked Franklin's highest debut position yet as well as her highest peak since 1985's Who's Zoomin' Who?. A steady seller, the album sold 294,000 copies within its first five months of release and was eventually certified gold by the Recording Industry Association of America (RIAA) in August 1998, indicating sales in excess of more than 500,000 units. Her biggest commercial success of the 1990s, A Rose Is Still a Rose would remain Franklin's final album to earn a RIAA certification in the United States. Elsewhere, A Rose Is Still a Rose entered the top forty of the charts it appeared on but was less successful than previous releases. The album debuted and peaked at number 29 on the Swedish Albums Chart, and reached number 32 and number 36 in Norway and Switzerland, becoming her lowest-charting album since 1983's Get It Right on all three markets.

A Rose Is Still a Rose produced two singles, led by its same-titled lead single. Franklin's highest-charting single in four years, it peaked at number 26 on the US Billboard Hot 100 and reached number 22 on the UK Singles Chart, marking Franklin's last top 40 hit on both markets until her death in 2018. In addition, "A Rose Is Still a Rose" topped Billboards Dance Club Songs chart and peaked at number five on the Hot R&B/Hip-Hop Songs. Follow-up "Here We Go Again" also reached number one on Billboards Dance Club Songs.

Track listing
Credits adapted from the liner notes of A Rose Is Still a Rose.

Additional Notes
Production for "In Case You Forgot" and "In the Morning" is coordinated by Ivy Skoff
Production for "How Many Times" and "Watch My Back" are coordinated by Kevin Walden, Cherise Miller, Janice Lee & Shiloh Hobel

Charts

Weekly charts

Year-end charts

Certifications

References 

Aretha Franklin albums
1998 albums
Albums produced by Babyface (musician)
Albums produced by Dallas Austin
Albums produced by Jermaine Dupri
Albums produced by Narada Michael Walden
Albums produced by Sean Combs
Arista Records albums
Albums produced by Michael J. Powell